Roland Bernhard Koch (born 28 October 1952) is a German football coach.

Career
Born in Osnabrück, Roland Koch played for SV Meppen and BC Berrenrath. After finishing his career as a player, he began working in 1981 as amateur coach with 1. FC Köln. In the 1986–87 season he was promoted to assistant coach of Christoph Daum. He worked with Christoph Daum as an assistant manager for several years. In the 2002–03 season Koch signed for Iranian club Esteghlal F.C. as a manager. At the start of the 2003–04 season he began again as assistant manager of Christoph Daum for Fenerbahçe S.K.

References

External links
 

1952 births
Living people
German footballers
Beşiktaş J.K. managers
Fenerbahçe football managers
Esteghlal F.C. managers
German football managers
Expatriate football managers in Iran
VfL Osnabrück managers
Sportspeople from Osnabrück
Association footballers not categorized by position
Footballers from Lower Saxony
Persian Gulf Pro League managers